The discography of Earth, an Olympia, Washington-based experimental music group, consists of nine studio albums, six live albums, a compilation album, a remix album, a video album, three extended plays, four split releases and a music video.

Albums

Studio albums

Live albums

Remix albums

Compilation albums

Video albums

EPs

Split releases

Singles
 "Cats on the Briar" (2019)

Music videos

References

External links
 

Rock music group discographies
Heavy metal group discographies
Discographies of American artists